"We Gon Ride" is a single by New Zealand rapper, Dei Hamo, released in 2004. On the singles charts, it peaked at # 1 in New Zealand and at # 31 in Australia.

Music video
Ex New Zealand rugby/league star Matthew Ridge can be seen in the music video for the song.

Track listings
 CD single - (HiRuys 9823484)
"We Gon Ride" (Radio Edit)
"Hot Girl" (Single Edit)
"Pop Dat '03"
"We Gon Ride" (Instrumental) 
"We Gon Ride" (A Capella)

Charts

References

2004 songs
2004 singles
Number-one singles in New Zealand